Rajamangala Lanna Phitsanulok is a male professional volleyball team based in Phitsanulok, Thailand. The club plays in the Thailand league.

Honours

Domestic competitions
Thailand League 
  Champion (1): 2015–16
  Third (3): 2014–15, 2017–18, 2019–20
 Thai-Denmark Super League 
  Runner-up (1): 2015
  Third (3): 2016, 2017, 2019

International competitions
 Asian Club Championship 1 appearances 
 2016 — 11th place

League results

Former names
 Phitsanulok (2005–2008)
 Wing 46 Toyota-Phitsanulok  (2013–2014)
 Wing 46 Phitsanulok  (2014–2015)
 Diamond Food RMUTL Phitsanulok (2016–2018)
 Rajamangala Lanna Phitsanulok (2018–)

Current squad
As of January 2018

Notable players

Domestic Players

 Kitsada Somkane
 Kittikun Sriutthawong 
 Ratchapoom Samthong
 Supachai Sriphum
 Supachai Prachong
 Santi Somsook
 Kritsada Sri-ngam
 Anuchai Thongsit
 Apisit Matta
 Thammapat Anantakan
 Anut Promchan
 Thanasak Pasanate
 Aekkawee Bangsri
 Jakkapong Tongklang
 Anurak Chantong-on
 Kiatisuk khanliwut
 Kittinon Namkhuntod
 Teerasak Nakprasong
 Adipong Phonpinyo
 Montri Puanglib

Foreigner Players

 Connor Dougherty

 Steven Hunt
 Jasmin Cull
 Terrel Bramwell

 Luiz Perezto
 Pablo Femando

References

External links
 Official fanpage

Volleyball clubs in Thailand
Volleyball clubs established in 2013